El Chaco is a location in the Napo Province, Ecuador. It is the seat of the El Chaco Canton.

References 
 www.inec.gov.ec
 www.ame.gov.ec

External links 
 Map of the Napo Province

Populated places in Napo Province